Arjanak (also Romanized as Arjānak and Arjenk; also known as Arjang) is a village in Howmeh Rural District, in the Central District of Shahrekord County, Chaharmahal and Bakhtiari Province, Iran. At the 2006 census, its population was 1,234, in 325 families. The village is populated by Persians.

References 

Populated places in Shahr-e Kord County